= Rasuliya Gusain =

- village
- Location within Madhya Pradesh Location within India
- Coordinates: 23.1878217°N 77.2893606°E
- Country: India
- State: Madhya Pradesh
- District: Bhopal
- Tehsil: Huzur
- Elevation: 532 m (1,745 ft)

Population (2011)
  - Total: 532
- Time zone: UTC+5:30 (IST)
- ISO 3166 code: MP-IN
- 2011 census code: 482506

Rasuliya Gusain is a village in the Bhopal district of Madhya Pradesh, India. It is located in the Huzur tehsil and the Phanda block.

== Demographics ==
According to the 2011 census of India, Rasuliya Gusain has 113 households. The effective literacy rate (i.e. the literacy rate of population excluding children aged 6 and below) is 50.36%.

Demographics (2011 Census)
	Total	Male	Female
Population	532	261	271
Children aged below 6 years	117	51	66
Scheduled caste	41	17	24
Scheduled tribe	0	0	0
Literates	209	124	85
Workers (all)	309	162	147
Main workers (total)	255	135	120
Main workers: Cultivators	49	25	24
Main workers: Agricultural labourers	183	99	84
Main workers: Household industry workers	1	1	0
Main workers: Other	22	10	12
Marginal workers (total)	54	27	27
Marginal workers: Cultivators	11	9	2
Marginal workers: Agricultural labourers	29	12	17
Marginal workers: Household industry workers	0	0	0
Marginal workers: Others	14	6	8
Non-workers	223	99	124
